The Scoville scale is a measurement of pungency (spiciness or "heat") of chili peppers and other substances, recorded in Scoville heat units (SHU), based on the concentration of capsaicinoids, among which capsaicin is the predominant component.

The scale is named after its creator, American pharmacist Wilbur Scoville, whose 1912 method is known as the Scoville organoleptic test. The Scoville organoleptic test is a subjective assessment derived from the capsaicinoid sensitivity by people experienced with eating hot chilis.

An alternative method, high-performance liquid chromatography (HPLC), can be used to analytically quantify the capsaicinoid content as an indicator of pungency. As of 2011, the subjective organoleptic test has been largely superseded by analytical methods such as HPLC.

Scoville organoleptic test 
In the Scoville organoleptic test, an exact weight of dried pepper is dissolved in alcohol to extract the heat components (capsaicinoids), then diluted in a solution of sugar water. Decreasing concentrations of the extracted capsaicinoids are given to a panel of five trained tasters, until a majority (at least three) can no longer detect the heat in a dilution. The heat level is based on this dilution, rated in multiples of 100 SHU.

Another source using subjective assessment stated: "Conventional methods used in determining the level of pungency or capsaicin concentration are using a panel of tasters (Scoville organoleptic test method). ... Pepper pungency is measured in Scoville heat units (SHU). This measurement is the highest dilution of a chili pepper extract at which heat can be detected by a taste panel."

A weakness of the Scoville organoleptic test is its imprecision due to human subjectivity, depending on the taster's palate and number of mouth heat receptors, which vary widely among subjects. Another shortcoming is sensory fatigue; the palate is quickly desensitized to capsaicinoids after tasting a few samples within a short time period. Results vary widely (up to ± 50%) between laboratories.

Quantification by HPLC 

Since the 1980s, spice heat has been assessed quantitatively by high-performance liquid chromatography (HPLC), which measures the concentration of heat-producing capsaicinoids, typically with capsaicin content as the main measure. As stated in one review: "the most reliable, rapid, and efficient method to identify and quantify capsaicinoids is HPLC; the results of which can be converted to Scoville heat units by multiplying the parts-per-million by 16."

HPLC method gives results in American Spice Trade Association 1985 "pungency units", which are defined as one part capsaicin equivalent per million parts dried pepper mass. This "parts per million of heat" (ppmH) is found with the following calculation: 

Peak areas are calculated from HPLC traces of dry samples of the substance to be tested in 1 ml of acetonitrile. The standard used to calibrate the calculation is 1 gram of capsaicin. Scoville heat units are found by multiplying the ppmH value by a factor of 15.  By this definition of ppmH, spicy compounds other than the two most important capsaicinoids are ignored, despite the ability of HPLC to measure these other compounds at the same time.

An orally administered capsule of capsaicinoids claiming 100,000 Scoville units will correspond to around 6.6 mg of capsaicinoids per gram.

Scoville ratings

Considerations
Since Scoville ratings are defined per unit of dry mass, comparison of ratings between products having different water content can be misleading.  For example, typical fresh chili peppers have a water content around 90%, whereas Tabasco sauce has a water content of 95%. For law-enforcement-grade pepper spray, values from 500,000 up to 5 million SHU have been reported, but the actual strength of the spray depends on the dilution. This problem can be overcome by stating the water content along with the Scoville value. One way to do so is the "D-value", defined as total mass divided by dry mass.

Numerical results for any specimen vary depending on its cultivation conditions and the uncertainty of the laboratory methods used to assess the capsaicinoid content. Pungency values for any pepper are variable, owing to expected variation within a species, possibly by a factor of 10 or more, depending on seed lineage, climate and humidity, and soil composition supplying nutrients. The inaccuracies described in the measurement methods also contribute to the imprecision of these values.

Capsicum peppers

Capsicum chili peppers are commonly used to add pungency in cuisines worldwide. The range of pepper heat reflected by a Scoville score is from 500 or less (sweet peppers) to over 1.5 million (Carolina Reaper) (table below; Scoville scales for individual chili peppers are in the respective linked article). Some peppers such as the Guntur chilli and Rocoto are excluded from the list due to their very wide SHU range. Others such as Pepper X, Dragon's Breath, and Chocolate 7-pot have not been officially verified.

and TRPV1 agonists in general

The class of compounds causing pungency in plants such as chili peppers is called capsaicinoids, which display a linear correlation between concentration and Scoville scale, and may vary in content during ripening. Capsaicin is the major capsaicinoid in chili peppers.

The Scoville scale may be used to express the pungency of other, unrelated TRPV1 agonists, sometimes with extrapolation for much hotter compounds. One such substance is resiniferatoxin, an alkaloid present in the sap of some species of euphorbia plants (spurges). Since it is 1000 times as hot as capsaicin, it would have a Scoville scale rating of 16 billion. In the table below, non-capsaicinoid compounds are italicized.

See also

Explanatory notes

References 

1912 introductions
Scoville scale
Gustatory system
Scales
Spices
Units of measurement